Adrien is a given name and surname, and the French spelling for the name Adrian. It is also the masculine form of the feminine name Adrienne. It may refer to:

People

Given name
 Adrien Auzout (1622–1691), French astronomer
 Adrien Baillet (1649–1706), French scholar and critic
 Adrien Brody (born 1973), American actor
 Adrien Broom, American photographer
 Adrien, Count of Rougé (1782–1838), French statesman
 Adrien de Wignacourt (1618–1697), Grand Master of the Knights Hospitaller
 Adrien Douady (1935–2006), French mathematician
 Adrien Duvillard (alpine skier born 1969), French Olympic alpine skier
 Adrien Manglard (1695–1760), French painter
 Adrien Perez (soccer) (born 1995), American professional soccer player
 Adrien Perez (swimmer) (born 1988), Swiss swimmer
 Adrien Perruchon (born 1983), French conductor
 Adrien Rabiot (born 1995), French soccer player
 Adrien Robinson (born 1988), American football player
 Adrien Silva (born 1989), Portuguese-French footballer
 Adrien Tremblay (2000–today), French-Canadian normal man
 Adrien Voisin (1890–1979) American sculptor
 Adrien Zeller (1940–2009), French politician

Surname
 Caroline Adrien (born 1987), French kitesurfer
 Jeff Adrien (born 1986), American basketball player
 Martin-Joseph Adrien (1766–1823), French operatic bass

Fictional characters
 Adrien Agreste, in the animated television series Miraculous: Tales of Ladybug & Cat Noir

See also 
 
 Adrian
 Adrianne
 Adrienne

References 

English masculine given names
English-language masculine given names
French masculine given names